Severe Tropical Storm Halong, known in the Philippines as Typhoon Cosme, was the fourth severe tropical storm named by the Japan Meteorological Agency (JMA) who are the Regional Specialized Meteorological Centre for the Northwestern Pacific Ocean. The Joint Typhoon Warning Center also recognised Halong as the fifth tropical depression, the fourth tropical storm as well as the third typhoon of the 2008 Pacific typhoon season.

Meteorological history

Late on May 13 a tropical disturbance formed in the South China Sea. Early the next day, the Japan Meteorological Agency (JMA) and the Philippine Atmospheric, Geophysical and Astronomical Services Administration (PAGASA) designated the disturbance as a tropical depression, with PAGASA assigning the local name of Cosme. However the Joint Typhoon Warning Center (JTWC) did not issue a Tropical Cyclone Formation Alert until later that day. The JTWC then designated the depression as 05W on May 15. On May 16 both the JMA and the JTWC upgraded the depression to a tropical storm with the JMA designating it as Tropical Storm Halong and assigning the international number of 0804. This was 12 hours after PAGASA had upgraded it to a tropical storm. During that day Halong kept intensifying and was designated as a severe tropical storm early the next day by the JMA as it reached its peak wind speeds of 60 knots (70 mph 115 km/h).  The JTWC then upgraded Halong to a typhoon with peak wind speeds of 70 knots (80 mph 130 km/h)) which made Halong a Category one typhoon on the Saffir-Simpson Hurricane Scale.

Later on May 17, Halong made landfall on the Philippine region of Pangasinan and travelled towards the northeast over Luzon.  While over land Halong weakened into a tropical storm with both the JTWC and the JMA downgrading Halong early the next day. Later that day after reaching the Philippine Sea, Halong started to restrengthen and intensified into a severe tropical storm. However it did not intensify any further and on May 19 weakened into a tropical storm. Later that day, PAGASA issued their final advisory on Halong as it moved out of their area of responsibility. The JTWC then issued their last advisory on Halong as it had begun its extratropical transition. The JMA then reported that it had completed its extratropical transition and issued their final advisory on the remnant low of Halong. The remnants of Halong dissipated on May 24.

Preparations
Starting May 15, PAGASA issued Storm Warning Signals for various areas across the Philippines. At 1500 UTC that day Signal Number One was initially issued over northern Palawan, Occidental Mindoro and Lubang Island. At its maximum coverage (at 0930 UTC May 17), Storm Signal Number 3 was issued for Zambales, Pangasinan, La Union, Tarlac, Benguet and Ilocos Sur, Signal Number 2 was for Bataan, Bulacan, Pampanga, Nueva Vizcaya, Nueva Ecija, Quirino, Ifugao, Mt. Province, Kalinga, Abra, Apayao and Ilocos Norte and Signal Number 1 was raised for Lubang Island, Batangas, Cavite, Laguna, Rizal, northern Quezon, Isabela, Aurora, Cagayan, Calayan Island, Babuyan Group of Islands, Batanes and Metro Manila Further on as Cosme (Halong) razed through Northern Luzon, these storm signals were scaled back until the storm reached the Cagayan-Batanes area and the Pacific Ocean proper.

Impact

Philippines
In Luzon, the typhoon caused 58 deaths and $94 million (USD) in damage. The storm destroyed 43,365 houses and damaged 188,830 more. Most of the damages reported were in Northern Luzon. Meanwhile, Mindoro and Panay islands were also affected as the storm-induced southwest monsoon brought rains and floods to those areas. In particular, a ferry in Mindoro was stranded as Cosme (still a tropical depression at that time) passed close enough to Mindoro on the night of May 15. The Subic-Olongapo area, one of the economic zones of the Philippines, experienced power outages as the storm got closer to Zambales on May 17. The province of Pangasinan, where the storm made its landfall, experienced waist-high floods and power outages as well. Even the city of Dagupan (in Pangasinan) suffered the same fate with even stranded persons all over the city due to flooding. The town of Sta. Cruz in Zambales had about 7,000 people homeless due to Cosme. Overall, the hardest hit were Pangasinan and Zambales provinces. Because the damage caused by the storm in Zambales is extensive even in infrastructure, repair was forced to be done on schools there as that time, classes are to resume in the next few weeks. The storm also increased the prices of vegetables in Metro Manila, as the latter gets most of its vegetables from Northern Luzon. Many places were flooded like what happened from Typhoon Ketsana.

According to the final report on Cosme (Halong) released by the National Disaster Coordinating Council, 61 were reported killed, 33 wounded and three were left missing. People affected by Cosme numbered 1,496,635 persons in 1,510 barangays in five provinces. Damages to property totaled to PHP 4.712 billion, of PHP 3.721 billion were agricultural losses and PHP 992 million were destroyed infrastructure. Pangasinan was the most damaged province as indicated by the report.

Japan
The extratropical remnants of Halong brought heavy rains to parts of Japan, injuring one person.

Naming
The name "Halong" was one of the 10 original names submitted by Vietnam to the WMO's Typhoon Committee for use from January 1, 2000. Halong was last used in the 2002 Pacific typhoon season and is named after Halong Bay, which is a UNESCO World Heritage site in Vietnam. The Philippine Atmospheric, Geophysical and Astronomical Services Administration (PAGASA) assigned the name Cosme to the tropical storm. Cosme was last used in the 2004 Pacific typhoon season to name Typhoon Sudal. This was the seventh time that a tropical cyclone had been named Cosme. After Cosme/Halong caused a high amount of damage to the Philippines, the name Cosme was removed from PAGASA's naming lists. In June 2012 the name selected by PAGASA to replace Cosme was Carina, and was first used in the 2012 season.

See also

 Tropical cyclones in 2008
 Typhoon Vicki (1998) – a typhoon which also had a similar path to Halong.
 Tropical Storm Linfa (2003) – another tropical cyclone that took an eastward track towards Luzon. 
 Typhoon Chan-hom (2009) – another eastward-moving typhoon that affected the same areas as Halong.

References

External links

JMA General Information of Severe Tropical Storm Halong (0804) from Digital Typhoon
JMA Best Track Data of Severe Tropical Storm Halong (0804) 
JMA Best Track Data (Graphics) of Severe Tropical Storm Halong (0804)
JMA Best Track Data (Text)
JTWC Best Track Data of Typhoon 05W (Halong)
05W.HALONG from the U.S. Naval Research Laboratory

2008 Pacific typhoon season
2008 disasters in the Philippines
Typhoons in the Philippines
Western Pacific severe tropical storms
Typhoons in Vietnam
Halong